André Lamontagne is a Canadian politician in Quebec, who was elected to the National Assembly of Quebec in the 2014 election. He represents the electoral district of Johnson as a member of the Coalition Avenir Québec.

Cabinet posts

References

Coalition Avenir Québec MNAs
Living people
French Quebecers
Members of the Executive Council of Quebec
21st-century Canadian politicians
Year of birth missing (living people)
Université Laval alumni